Ramblin' Gamblin' Man is the debut album by American rock band the Bob Seger System, released in 1969.

Musical style 
The music of Ramblin' Gamblin' Man has been classified as blues rock,  folk, garage rock, heavy rock, psychedelic rock, rock and roll and soul.

Release 

The original title was Tales of Lucy Blue, hence the cover art. In the liner notes, Bob Seger says (sarcastically) he later realized Lucy Blue was "Ramblin' Gamblin' Man", and so changed the title of the album. He then thanks "Doctor Fine" for this realization. (Doctor Fine being the person who made Seger change the album's name.) The original cover design for the album featured the nude figure from Botticelli's The Birth of Venus, but this too was changed for the final release.

The title track was also performed on Bob Seger and the Silver Bullet Band's live album Live Bullet.

Track listing

Personnel
The Bob Seger System
 Bob Seger – guitar, lead vocals, piano, organ
 Dan Honaker – bass, vocals
 Pep Perrine – drums, vocals
 Bob Schultz – organ on "Ramblin' Gamblin' Man"
Additional personnel
 Michael Erlewine – blues harp on "Down Home"
 Glenn Frey – backing vocals and acoustic guitar on "Ramblin' Gamblin' Man"
 Penny Lawyer – backing vocals

Production
 The Bob Seger System & Punch Andrews
 Engineer: Jim Bruzzese
 Liner notes: Bob Seger
 Front and Back cover illustration (LP) - Lockart

Charts

Album - Billboard (United States)

Singles - Billboard (United States)

References

Bob Seger albums
1969 debut albums
Albums produced by Punch Andrews
Capitol Records albums